Jati Shah Rehman is a small village in Gujranwala District, Punjab, Pakistan. It had a population of 1,304 in the 2017 Pakistan census.

See also 
 Gujranwala Electric Power Company
 Aminabad, Gujranwala
 Ali Pur Chatta
 Sooianwala

References

Villages in Gujranwala District